Icart may refer to:

 Icart Point, a point in southern Guernsey
 Louis Icart (1888-1950), a French painter, graphic artist and illustrator
 Luys Ycart (fl. 1396–1433), also spelled Lluís Icart, Catalan poet
 Martín Icart (* 1984), Uruguayan footballer